Charuga (Čaruga) is a 1991 Yugoslav film directed by Rajko Grlić. Based on the novel by Ivan Kušan, it tells a true story about legendary Slavonian bandit Jovo Stanisavljević Čaruga.

During its premiere, Charuga was described as "the last Yugoslav film", because its theatrical run coincided with the process of the Yugoslav break-up and escalation of conflict into the Croatian War of Independence.

Others saw film as an allegoric portrayal of the rise and fall of Communism, because the film's protagonist (played by Ivo Gregurević) used Communism as a pretext to get rich and enjoy luxurious lifestyle.

References

External links

1991 films
Yugoslav adventure films
Films directed by Rajko Grlić
Films based on Croatian novels
Films scored by Goran Bregović
Croatian biographical films
Croatian adventure films
Yugoslav biographical films
Croatian comedy films
Yugoslav comedy films